Christoforos Tsolakis (born 30 October 2001) is a Cypriot footballer, who played for Olympiakos Nicosia. He is currently a free agent.

References

2001 births
Living people
Sportspeople from Limassol
Cypriot footballers
Cypriot First Division players
Olympiakos Nicosia players
Apollon Limassol FC players
Association football defenders